Qantas is the flag carrier airline of Australia.

Qantas may also refer to:
Qantas (genus), a genus of trematosauroid temnospondyl from the Early Triassic
Qantas Awards (disambiguation)
Qantas Defence Services, a defense service now part of Northrop Grumman
Qudos Bank, formerly Qantas Credit Union, an Australian credit union

See also
 Qanat (disambiguation)
 Quanta (disambiguation)